This article describes the knockout stage of the 2016–17 Women's EHF Champions League.

Qualified teams
The top four placed teams from each of the two main round groups advanced to the knockout stage.

Format
The first-placed team of each group faced the fourth-placed team, and the second-placed team played against the third-placed team from the other group. After that a draw was held to determine the pairings for the final four.

Quarterfinals

Overview

|}

Matches

Vardar won 54–50 on aggregate.

Győri ETO won 59–54 on aggregate.

CSM București won 57–51 on aggregate.

Buducnost won 66–47 on aggregate.

Final four
The final four was held at the László Papp Budapest Sports Arena in Budapest, Hungary on 6 and 7 May 2017.

The draw was held on 18 April 2017 at 13:00 in Budapest, Hungary.

Bracket

Semifinals

Third place game

Final

References

External links
Final four website

knockout stage